Bayanaul is a district of Pavlodar Region in northern Kazakhstan. The administrative center of the district is the selo of Bayanaul. Population:

Geography
Bayanaul District lies in the Kazakh Uplands.  high mount Akbet in the Bayanaul Range is the highest point in the district and Tuzkol is the largest lake.

References

Districts of Kazakhstan
Pavlodar Region